British Rail's Class 27 comprised 69 diesel locomotives built by the Birmingham Railway Carriage and Wagon Company (BRCW) during 1961 and 1962. They were a development of the earlier Class 26; both were originally classified as the BRCW Type 2. The Class 27s were numbered D5347-D5415.

Working life 

Original allocations were D5347–D5369 to Glasgow Eastfield, D5370–D5378 to Thornaby and D5379–D5415 to London Cricklewood for Tilbury Boat trains and Cross-London freight services. In the period September to December 1963, some of the Cricklewood allocation were transferred to Leicester and in December 1965 the Thornaby allocation was also nominally transferred to Leicester to join them. Traffic changes combined with reallocation of Class 25s led to the gradual transfer of the Leicester and Cricklewood locomotives to Scotland during 1969 thus concentrating the whole class within Scotland and being part of the replacement fleet that allowed the withdrawal of the poorly performing Clayton Class 17 locomotives from traffic. For many years they were extensively used on the West Highland Line. By September 1986, the final vacuum brake only locomotives had been withdrawn, regular duties on passenger services had ceased and only twenty-one of the class remained, allocated entirely to Eastfield depot. A mass withdrawal in July 1987 due to the presence of blue asbestos left 27008 as the last in service. Its final working was on 13 August and the loco was officially withdrawn on 19 August 1987. The Class 27s were actually outlived by the older Class 26s, whose less powerful engines were more reliable.

Sub-classes
 27/0: Locomotives as built with steam heating (excluding 27024–27031)
 27/1: Locomotives converted in 1971–1973 for push pull operation, renumbered back to 27/0 after conversion starting in 1982.
 27/2: Locomotives converted in 1973–1976 with Electric Train Heat, renumbered back to 27/0 after conversion starting in 1982.

Edinburgh-Glasgow push-pull operation 
By the late 1960s, the Swindon-built Inter City DMUs operating the  -  express service were becoming unreliable.  In 1970 the decision was made to replace them with locomotive-hauled carriages. So between 1971 and 1973, twenty-four Class 27s were fitted-up with dual (vacuum and air) brakes and reclassified Class 27/1, while 36 Mark 2 carriages (7 brake second opens, 22 open seconds, and 7 corridor firsts) swapped their vacuum-operated shoe brakes for air-operated disc brakes and were though-wired with "Blue Star" control cables to enable "top and tail" push-pull working. It was later decided that as the Mark 2 stock was dual (steam or electric) heated, to convert half the 27/1 fleet to electric train heat, by replacing the train heating boiler with a Deutz 8-cylinder, air-cooled diesel engine and alternator. The conversions were then classified as Class 27/2, and were used on one end of the train, with a 27/1 on the other.

The very intensive  "push-pull" service was demanding on the locomotives and reliability started to suffer. The 27/2s, especially, appeared prone to fire damage, especially from their electric train heating alternators. The push-pull sets were replaced in 1980 by single Class 47/7s at one end of a rake of Mark 2 carriages and a DBSO.

Accidents and incidents
 On 30 June 1962, locomotive D5386 was in a minor collision with a diesel multiple unit at Cricklewood carriage sidings, London due to confusion over a hand signal. The engine is now preserved and stored at Barrow Hill Roundhouse.
 On 25 August 1965, locomotive D5383 was heading a freight train that collided with the rear on another freight train at East Langton. It was taken to Derby Works for evaluation, but was withdrawn in January the following year.
 Locomotive 27 044 was severely damaged by fire before 5 September 1980. It was consequently withdrawn and scrapped.

Fleet list

Preserved locomotives 

Eight examples of the class have been preserved at various heritage railways in Great Britain. Two members of this class were rescued from Vic Berry's Scrapyard in the 1980s. D5410/27059 was rescued from Vic Berry's Scrapyard in September 1987  and D5401/27056 was also rescued from there in October 1987.

Notes

Footnotes

References 
 
 
 
 
 

 
 Ian Allan ABC of British Railways Locomotives, 1983 edition

Further reading

External links 

 Scottish Railway Preservation Society home to 27001 and 27005
 Mid Hants Railway home to 27007
 Caledonian Railway Diesel Group, owners of 27024
 Owners of 27056 based at the Great Central Railway
 Severn Valley Railway home to 27059
 Owners of 27066 based at the Dean Forest Railway

27
BRCW locomotives
Bo-Bo locomotives
Railway locomotives introduced in 1961
Standard gauge locomotives of Great Britain
Diesel-electric locomotives of Great Britain